Sable Island is a Canadian drama film, directed by Johanne Prégent and released in 1999. The film stars Caroline Dhavernas as Manou, a 16-year-old girl from smalltown Quebec who runs off with her boyfriend Jim (Sébastien Huberdeau) to Sable Island, Nova Scotia following the death of her mother; during the trip she regularly calls home to speak to her older sister Geneviève (Anick Lemay), who reveals family secrets that radically reconfigure Manou's understanding of her life.

The film's cast also includes François Papineau as Geneviève's boyfriend, and Marie Tifo as Jim's mother.

Huberdeau received a Jutra Award nomination for Best Actor at the 2nd Jutra Awards in 2000.

References

External links

1999 films
Canadian drama films
Canadian coming-of-age drama films
Films shot in Quebec
Films shot in Nova Scotia
Quebec films
French-language Canadian films
1990s Canadian films